Emberizoidea is a superfamily of passerines that are referred to as the New World nine-primaried oscines that includes majority of endemics which are exclusive to the New World.  Nearly 892 species belong to this group as it includes buntings, American sparrows, the New World blackbirds, the parulid warblers, the cardinals, and the tanagers. The group originated after a rapid speciation event in North America after arriving from Eurasia via Bering strait during the Miocene epoch. Two groups from within the emberizoids diversified further in the Neotropics where one clade comprising several small Caribbean endemic species and the other, the tanager-cardinal group, in South America. Another two families, the Emberizidae (buntings) and the Calcariidae (longspurs and snow buntings), return to Eurasia and colonized.

The interrelationships among the emberizoids has been a source of contention as several genera have been shifted around in many phylogenetic studies. The cladogram of the emberizoids shown below is primarily based on the analysis of Carl Oliveros and colleagues published in 2019.

The study considered Spindalidae and Nesospingidae to both be part of Phaenicophilidae, and Icteriidae as being a part of Icteridae, but they are shown as distinct in this tree. In addition, while Teretistridae was not analyzed in the study, previous studies indicated them as being allied with Zeledoniidae.

References

Notes

Passeroidea
Bird superfamilies